Leesburg High School may refer to:
Leesburg High School (Leesburg, Florida)
Leesburg High School (Leesburg, Georgia)